Al-Tahaddi Sports Club is a Libyan football club based in Benghazi. They are a member of the top division in Libyan football, but were relegated in season 2007/08.  Their home stadium is March 28 Stadium.

Honors
Libyan Premier League: 3
1968, 1977, 1997

Libyan Cup: 0
Finalist: 1999

Libyan SuperCup: 1
1997

Performance in CAF competitions
 African Cup of Champions Clubs: 2 appearances
1969: First Round
1978: Second Round

CAF Cup: 1 appearance
2002 – First Round

External links
Team profile – endirect24.com

Tahaddy
Association football clubs established in 1954
1954 establishments in Libya